Henricus Cornelis Maria "Henk" Krol (born 1 April 1950) is a Dutch journalist, publisher, entrepreneur, activist and politician. He has been a member of the House of Representatives since 10 September 2014. He used to be the leader of 50PLUS, but left the party in 2020, due to disagreements with the rest of the party's leadership. From 3 May to 18 October 2020, Krol was the leader of the Party for the Future.

Career 
Krol served as the main spokesman for the People's Party for Freedom and Democracy (VVD) in the House of Representatives from 1978 until 1985.

Krol was editor-in-chief of the magazine Gay Krant, which he founded in 1980.

Between March 2011 and September 2012, he was member of the States-Provincial of North Brabant.

For the 2012 general election Krol was the lijsttrekker (top candidate) for the Pensioners' Party 50PLUS.

Krol was the Parliamentary leader of 50PLUS in the House of Representatives from 13 September 2012 until 4 October 2013 and a Member of the House of Representatives from 20 September 2012 until 4 October 2013.

On 4 October 2013, de Volkskrant published an article alleging that Krol withheld pension money from his employees from 2004 until 2007, and then again in 2009, while working for the Gay Krant. De Volkskrant said that the tip-off leading to the article had come via Publeaks NL, a new Dutch anonymous whistleblowing initiative. The same day, Krol announced his resignation from the House of Representatives in a letter, admitting that he made 'many mistakes'. Although he did not address the allegations directly, he concluded that "it is impossible for me to continue in my function as representative". He was replaced in the House of Representatives by Martine Baay-Timmerman on 29 October 2013.

He was elected with preferential votes for the Ouderen Appèl party to the municipal council of Eindhoven in March 2014. Krol returned to the House of Representatives on 10 September 2014, when Martine Baay-Timmerman went on sick leave.

After disagreements with the party top of 50PLUS he resigned from the leadership position and exited the party. He founded the Party for the Future together with formerly independent member of the House of Representatives Femke Merel van Kooten, but left the party a few months later.

Decorations
  Knight of the Order of Orange-Nassau (Netherlands, 1999)

References

External links
  H.C.M. (Henk) Krol Parlement.com

1950 births
Living people
20th-century Dutch businesspeople
20th-century Dutch male writers
21st-century Dutch businesspeople
21st-century Dutch male writers
21st-century Dutch politicians
50PLUS politicians
Dutch critics
Dutch elder rights activists
Dutch health and wellness writers
Dutch journalists
Dutch magazine editors
Dutch newspaper editors
Dutch newspaper publishers (people)
Dutch political activists
Dutch public relations people
Dutch publishers (people)
Dutch relationships and sexuality writers
Dutch television editors
Dutch television producers
Gay politicians
Dutch gay writers
Independent politicians in the Netherlands
Knights of the Order of Orange-Nassau
Leaders of 50PLUS
Dutch LGBT broadcasters
Dutch LGBT businesspeople
Dutch LGBT journalists
LGBT members of the Parliament of the Netherlands
Dutch LGBT rights activists
Members of the House of Representatives (Netherlands)
Members of the Provincial Council of North Brabant
Municipal councillors of Eindhoven
People from Tilburg
Vrije Universiteit Amsterdam alumni